Deborah Frank Lockhart is a mathematician known for her work with the National Science Foundation.

Career
Lockhart graduated in 1965 from the Bronx High School of Science. She received her BS in mathematics from New York University, and went on to receive her Ph.D. from Rensselaer Polytechnic Institute in the area of continuum mechanics.

Lockhart went on to work at SUNY Geneseo before moving to Michigan Technological University in 1976. She began working as a Program Director and then Deputy Division Director at the National Science Foundation.

Awards and honors

In 2012, Lockhart became a fellow of the American Mathematical Society. Also that year, she became a fellow of the American Association for the Advancement of Science. She is also the 2021 recipient of the Society for Industrial and Applied Mathematics (SIAM) Prize for Distinguished Service to the Profession.

Selected publications
Lockhart, Deborah F. Dynamic buckling of a damped imperfect column on a nonlinear foundation. Quart. Appl. Math. 36 (1978/79), no. 1, 49–55.

References

Living people
American women mathematicians
20th-century American mathematicians
21st-century American mathematicians
Fellows of the American Mathematical Society
Rensselaer Polytechnic Institute alumni
Fellows of the American Association for the Advancement of Science
20th-century women mathematicians
21st-century women mathematicians
Year of birth missing (living people)
The Bronx High School of Science alumni
20th-century American women
21st-century American women